"What Kind of Fool (Heard All That Before)" is a song recorded by Australian recording artist Kylie Minogue, released as the lead single from her first greatest hits album Greatest Hits (1992). The song was written by Mike Stock, Minogue and Pete Waterman, and produced by Stock and Waterman.

It was Minogue's last original single to be released from the record label PWL, as although "Celebration" was released as the last single, it was a cover version, not an original single. The single was released on 10 August 1992 across various formats and received positive reception from music critics, with many praising it as a good last single from PWL. The song peaked at numbers 17 and 14 in Australia and the United Kingdom, respectively.

Background
The song was taken from Minogue's first compilation album Greatest Hits as the first single and last original single to be released by her label PWL, but her second single from the album, "Celebration", was taken as the last single. The song was written by Stock and Waterman, as well as Minogue contributing in the lyrics and was produced by Stock and Waterman.

Reception

Critical response
The song received generally mixed reviews from music critics. Some compared it with "I Should Be So Lucky" and "Better the Devil You Know", but many suggested the song was regressive in comparison to Minogue's more mature work from the previous two years. A reviewer from Music Week commented, "Typically bright and breezy, it is however a little slight of melody and hooks when compared to some of her previous work – but that won't stop it from continuing her unbroken sequence of Top 20 hits." Ian McCann from New Musical Express wrote, "Kylie in bubbly, non-funky, standard home-grown PWL fare. Well-constructed as ever, but hardly "Step Back in Time", a monster that will surely dog her no matter what she does." Tom Doyle from Smash Hits gave "What Kind of Fool" three out of five, calling it a "tweety dance anthem" and "infinitely better than most poppy house records".
  
Minogue admitted in an interview with the Australian Sunday Telegraph in October 2008, that she was not fond of the song: "There's plenty I've cringed about," she says. "There's one track I really didn't like called 'What Kind of Fool'. But I realised you can run, but you can't hide, so I embraced 'I Should Be So Lucky' and the rest of them."

Chart performance
The song did not receive great commercial attention, although became a moderate hit in the UK and Australia where it debuted at number 37 (after five weeks it climbed and peaked at number 17). The song debuted at number 16 on the UK Singles Chart. later climbing to number 14, where it peaked, staying in the charts for five weeks. The song debuted at number 22 on the Irish Singles Chart, but fell off the charts after two weeks.

Music video
The accompanying music video for "What Kind of Fool" features Minogue sunbathing in front of a blanket, while a male actor is behind it with a rose. It later showed the male and Minogue having an argument in a bedroom. In the bridge, it shows Minogue in a blue plaid dress dancing under a spotlight.  She later teases her lover and dances atop a table. The music video later ends with Minogue kissing him and she walks out the room, while the man sits on a chair left alone. The song's reception itself became one of Minogue's least successful singles to date. The single's video recreated scenes made famous by Brigitte Bardot in the 1956 film And God Created Woman. The song was featured on MTV Classics channel in 2011 and was listed at number thirty-four on Evolution of... Kylie Minogue.

Track listings

 CD single
 "What Kind of Fool (Heard All That Before)"
 "What Kind of Fool (Heard All That Before)" [No Tech No Logical Remix]
 "What Kind of Fool (Heard All That Before)" [Tech No Logical Remix]
 "Things Can Only Get Better" [Original 7" Mix]

 7-inch vinyl
 "What Kind of Fool (Heard All That Before)"
 "Things Can Only Get Better" [Original 7" Mix]

 12-inch vinyl
 "What Kind of Fool (Heard All That Before)" [No Tech No Logical Remix]
 "What Kind of Fool (Heard All That Before)" [Tech No Logical Remix]
 "Things Can Only Get Better" [Original 12" Mix]

 Cassette single
 "What Kind of Fool (Heard All That Before)"
 "Things Can Only Get Better" [Original 7" Mix]

 Digital EP 
 "What Kind of Fool (Heard All That Before)"
 "What Kind of Fool (Heard All That Before)" [No Tech No Logical Remix]
 "What Kind of Fool (Heard All That Before)" [Tech No Logical Remix]
 "What Kind of Fool (Heard All That Before)" [12" Master Mix]
 "What Kind of Fool (Heard All That Before)" [Instrumental]
 "What Kind of Fool (Heard All That Before)" [Backing Track]
 "Things Can Only Get Better" [Original 7" Mix]
 "Things Can Only Get Better" [Original 12" Mix]
 "Things Can Only Get Better" [Original Instrumental]
 "Things Can Only Get Better" [Original Backing Track]

Charts

References

1992 singles
1992 songs
Kylie Minogue songs
Pete Waterman Entertainment singles
Songs written by Kylie Minogue
Songs written by Mike Stock (musician)
Songs written by Pete Waterman